WCIW-LP (107.7 FM, "Radio Conciencia") is an American low-power radio station licensed to serve the community of Immokalee, Florida, United States.  The station is operated by the Coalition of Immokalee Workers, an organization representing farm workers in one of the largest winter vegetable markets in the United States of America. The WCIW-LP broadcast license is held by Interfaith Action of Southwest Florida, Inc.

Programming
The languages include Spanish, Haitian Creole, and some of the indigenous languages of Central America.

History
In June 2001, Interfaith Action of Southwest Florida, Inc., applied to the Federal Communications Commission (FCC) for a construction permit for a new broadcast radio station. The FCC granted this permit on June 11, 2003, with a scheduled expiration date of December 11, 2004. The new station was assigned call sign "WCTI-LP" on December 2, 2003. The station was assigned new call sign "WCIW-LP" by the FCC on January 12, 2004. After construction and testing were completed, the station was granted its broadcast license on June 7, 2004.

WCIW-LP was the fifth community radio barnraising of the Prometheus Radio Project.

See also
List of community radio stations in the United States
List of Pacifica Radio stations and affiliates

References

External links
 

Community radio stations in the United States
Haitian-American culture in Florida
Haitian Creole-language mass media
Hispanic and Latino American culture in Florida
CIW-LP
CIW-LP
Radio stations established in 2004
Collier County, Florida
CIW-LP
2003 establishments in Florida